Treungen Church is a parish church of the Church of Norway in Nissedal Municipality in Vestfold og Telemark county, Norway. It is located in the village of Treungen. It is one of the churches for the Nissedal parish which is part of the Øvre Telemark prosti (deanery) in the Diocese of Agder og Telemark. The white, wooden church was built in a long church design in 1863 using plans drawn up by the architect Peter Høier Holtermann. The church seats about 250 people.

History
The earliest existing historical records of the church date back to the year 1395, but the church was not built that year. The church may have been built during the 13th century. The church was in poor condition by the 1700s, and in 1750, the old church was torn down and replaced with a new church on the same site. The new church was consecrated on 24 November 1750.

By 1860, the church had fallen into such disrepair that it was not considered worth the trouble to repair it. The church was designed by Peter Høier Holtermann and built by builder F. Scheuffert from Tvedestrand. The new church was consecrated on 25 March 1863. After the new church was in use, the old church was demolished. The old cemetery that surrounded the old church is still located on the hillside where the old church used to be. In the 1960s, the church was extensively restored and at the same time, a sacristy was built on the south side of the choir. Also the altar was changed; the church was painted; and the church got new pews, new windows, and a new roof. A storage room for the cemetery was also built in the basement of the church.

Media gallery

See also
List of churches in Agder og Telemark

References

Nissedal
Churches in Vestfold og Telemark
Long churches in Norway
Wooden churches in Norway
19th-century Church of Norway church buildings
Churches completed in 1863
13th-century establishments in Norway